Sitapha Alfred Savané Sagna (born 20 August 1978) is a Senegalese retired professional basketball player. He was a member of the Senegal national basketball team. He played his entire professional career in Spain, most of it in the ACB League.

Early life 
Sitapha Alfred Savané was born on 20 October 1978 in Dakar, Senegal, son to Landing Savané and Marie-Angélique Savané (née Sagna); his father (a Muslim) was a key figure in the Senegalese left-wing, while his mother (a Catholic) was a noted feminist and UN official. Savané lived for a while in Geneva (where his mother worked), moving to the United States at age fourteen. He attended the United Nations International School, where he caught the attention of the US Naval Academy.

College
Savané attended the United States Naval Academy, from which he graduated in 2000. In his junior and senior seasons, Savané was first team all Patriot League. He also led Navy in scoring, rebounding, blocks, field goal percentage and steals. He originally planned to not attend Navy, but when his Service Time was shortened he reconsidered.

Professional
Savané went undrafted in the 2000 NBA Draft (although he was drafted 13th in the second round of the USBL draft). He spent however all his career in Spain, especially in CB Gran Canaria where he spent eight seasons.

With Tenerife CB he won a Copa Príncipe de Asturias and a LEB Oro, promoting to Liga ACB.

He announced his retirement in May 2018.

Activity after retirement 
Savané became a sports commentator for Movistar+ after his retirement.

Awards 
 Hijo Adoptivo ("adoptive son") of Las Palmas (6 June 2016).

References
Informational notes

Citations

External links
 ACB.com profile 
 Profile CBGranCanaria.com 
 Draft Profile SportsIllustrated.com 2000 NBA Draft
 EurocupBasketball.com Profile

1978 births
Living people
2006 FIBA World Championship players
CB Estudiantes players
CB Gran Canaria players
Centers (basketball)
Joventut Badalona players
Liga ACB players
Navy Midshipmen men's basketball players
Senegalese expatriate basketball people in Spain
Senegalese expatriate basketball people in the United States
Senegalese men's basketball players
Spanish people of Senegalese descent
Tenerife CB players
United Nations International School alumni